Tuderna is a village in Võru Parish, Võru County, in southeastern Estonia. It's located on the left bank of Piusa River between Soena and Piusa villages.

Tuderna has a station on currently inactive Valga–Pechory railway.

References

 

Villages in Võru County